Albanese Candy is a candy manufacturer in Merrillville, Indiana. Founded in 1983 by Scott Albanese, it specializes in the production of gummies and chocolate-covered goods. As of 2022, the company employs roughly 700 workers and ships to 41 countries. It is said to be the home of "the world's best gummies."

Founder
Scott Albanese, the founder, was born in Dolton, Illinois. He credits his success to a strong work ethic attributable to "his construction/bricklayer/restaurant/blue-collar upbringing". He was inspired to open the business after buying raw materials of chocolates, candy, and nuts, and identifying a business opportunity. He says that opening a business in the 1980s seemed like poor timing, but that he saw an entrepreneurial opening and took it. He says that a commitment to consistent high quality and product integrity was integral to his success. In 2018, the Indiana Small Business Development Center gave him a Lifetime Achievement Award.

History
In 1995, the Merrillville facility had 10–12 employees.

In 1998, Albanese developed a new technology to allow more intense flavor release from gelatins. The system coats the candy trays with corn starch, a process used by only three candy-makers in the United States. Albanese is particularly known for its gummy candy; the Hobart store sells gummy worms, butterflies, and green army soldiers amongst many other shapes and flavors. In 2006, the company introduced  multicolor gummy snakes.

The Albanese company's soldier-shaped gummies were shipped to Iraq and distributed to deployed soldiers in 2003. This effort left the United States Air Force members feeling overlooked, and the company developed a product line featuring military jet aircraft molds: a B-2 Spirit, F-15 Eagle, F/A-18 Hornet, F/A-22 Raptor, F-117 Nighthawk, and SR-71 Blackbird.

The Hobart factory formerly offered self-guided tours; in the entrance hall, there was a  chocolate fountain, the largest in the country, which was custom crafted by a Hobart heating and cooling contractor that was removed during the 2020 renovation. 

In 2014, gummies graced a large scale stained glass window mural in Tokyo, Japan's Espace Luis Vuitton museum.

In 2017 the company announced that they would be adding 150 employees at the Hobart location. Additionally, they decided to invest $33 million into that location. The city of Hobart gave the company a ten-year tax abatement. The company said they would have 550 employees at the Hobart location.

In 2019 the company's Hobart location had a machinery fire. In 2020 one of the workers at the Hobart factory had to be airlifted to a hospital after being injured in the factory.

The company is continuously experimenting with products for key theme parks, Fannie May, and Marshall Fields, Scott said.

Awards
2006 Professional Candy Buyer's Product of the Year award - technology award for developing a process that can put omega-3 fish oil in the gummies
2020 Next Awards: Albanese Confectionery’s Ultimate 8 Flavor Gummi Bears won the Consumer Choice Award for Food and Beverage.

References

External links
 
 

Confectionery companies of the United States
1983 establishments in Indiana